Artur Gajdoš (born 20 January 2004) is a Slovak professional footballer who plays for AS Trenčín in the Fortuna Liga as a midfielder.

Club career

AS Trenčín
Gajdoš made his Fortuna Liga debut for AS Trenčín against Ružomberok on 1 November 2020. He came on late in the second half as a replacement for Ivenzo Comvalius when Trenčín was winning 2–0. Gajdoš witnessed two goals - Trenčín's third goal through Jakub Kadák, seconds after his arrival and Ružomberok's late sole goal by Ján Maslo. The match concluded with a 3–1 win. He debuted at a young age of 16 years, 9 months and 12 days, making him one of the youngest players ever and the second youngest player of the season, after Adam Griger of Zemplín Michalovce. Gajdoš also appeared as a substitute in five subsequent games including a 2–0 away loss with reigning champions and then-table leaders Slovan Bratislava.

International career
Gajdoš was first recognised in Slovak senior national team nomination in November 2022 by Francesco Calzona being listed as an alternate for two friendly fixtures against Montenegro and Marek Hamšík's retirement game against Chile. In December 2022, Gajdoš was shortlisted in the nomination for senior national team prospective players' training camp at NTC Senec.

References

External links
 AS Trenčín official club profile 
 Futbalnet profile 
 
 

2004 births
Living people
People from Ilava
Sportspeople from the Trenčín Region
Slovak footballers
Slovakia youth international footballers
Association football midfielders
AS Trenčín players
Slovak Super Liga players
2. Liga (Slovakia) players